Turnour may refer to:

Edward Garth-Turnour, 1st Earl Winterton (1734–1788), British politician
Edward Turnour, 4th Earl Winterton (1810–1879), first-class cricketer who played 25 times for Sussex CCC
Edward Turnour, 5th Earl Winterton (1837–1907), Irish peer and cricketer
Edward Turnour, 6th Earl Winterton PC (1883–1962), Irish peer and British politician
Edward Turnour (speaker) (1617–1676), Speaker of the House of Commons of England
George Turnour, British civil servant, scholar and a historian
Jim Turnour (born 1966), the Australian Labor Party MP for the division of Leichhardt
Turnour Island, in the Johnstone Strait region of the Central Coast of British Columbia

See also
Baron Turnour, title in the Peerage of Ireland
Turnour Prize, the oldest of the panel prizes at Royal College Colombo
Tourneur
Turner (disambiguation)